Sontag is an unincorporated community in northwest Lawrence County, Mississippi. It is the nearest community to Johnson-White House, a house listed on the U.S. National Register of Historic Places that was designed by architect Andrew Johnson. The community is located on the former Illinois Central Railroad. In 1900, the population was 25. The zip code is: 39665.

References

Unincorporated communities in Lawrence County, Mississippi
Unincorporated communities in Mississippi